Ricardo Luiz Gomes Mendes (born 2 April 1980), known as Ricardo Luiz or just Ricardo, is a Brazilian retired footballer who played as a defensive midfielder. He is the current youth football coordinator of Santos.

Playing career
Born in Belo Horizonte, Ricardo made his senior debut with hometown side América Mineiro in 2001, winning the Campeonato Mineiro. He then suffered relegation from the Série A later in the year, and later became a backup option until leaving in 2006.

Ricardo subsequently played for Novo Hamburgo, Legião, Volta Redonda, Guarani-MG and Fluminense-MG before retiring in 2010, aged just 30.

Post-playing career
In 2011, Ricardo returned to his first club América as a youth football coordinator. He later worked under the same role at Cruzeiro for five years, before being announced as the director of the youth categories at Cuiabá on 19 April 2021.

On 3 March 2022, Ricardo was named the youth football coordinator of Santos.

Honours
América Mineiro
Campeonato Mineiro: 2001

References

1980 births
Living people
Footballers from Belo Horizonte
Brazilian footballers
Association football midfielders
Campeonato Brasileiro Série A players
Campeonato Brasileiro Série B players
América Futebol Clube (MG) players
Esporte Clube Novo Hamburgo players
Volta Redonda FC players
Guarani Esporte Clube (MG) players
Santos FC non-playing staff